Hotel Mac is a historic hotel and restaurant, that was built in 1911 and is located in the historic Point Richmond neighborhood of Richmond, California in the United States.

History
The original hotel was built in 1911 and named the Colonial Hotel.  It served many different people, but mostly workers from the nearby Standard Oil refinery (now the Chevron Richmond Refinery).  In the 1930s it was purchased by J. V. McAfee, a former manager at the Claremont Hotel.  He also changed its name to the Hotel Mac.

Beginning in the 1940s and 1950s, however, Hotel Mac began to lose its popularity and character.  In 1971 a fire damaged the structure, and it closed for business.  In 1978 Bill Burnett and Griff Brazil formed a company to restore and reopen Hotel Mac as a fine dining restaurant.  The hotel also reopened.

In the fall of 2020, the restaurant's owner shuttered the restaurant's doors as a result of lost revenue due to the COVID-19 pandemic.

Today
Currently, the hotel is fully operational but the restaurant is closed. However, a lease contract was granted to the Richmond restauranteurs, Blanca Zepedalomeli and her husband Juvenal Magna, who plan on reopening the restaurant and bar in the fall of 2023. 

The hotel is notable because each of its 10 rooms are decorated with slightly different styles and color schemes.  Hotel Mac is a contributing property to the Point Richmond Historic District, and was also listed on the National Register of Historic Places in 1979.

References

External links 

Hotel Mac
Hotel buildings on the National Register of Historic Places in California
Hotels established in 1911
Hotel buildings completed in 1911
Hotel Mac
National Register of Historic Places in Contra Costa County, California
1911 establishments in California